The 2004 Wizard Home Loans Cup was the Australian Football League competition played in its entirety before the Australian Football League's 2004 Premiership Season began. The AFL National Cup is also sometimes referred to as the pre-season cup because it is played in its entirety before the Premiership Season begins.

Games

Round 1

|- bgcolor="#CCCCFF"
|Home team||Home team score||Away team||Away team score||Ground||Crowd||Date
|- bgcolor="#FFFFFF"
|  || 2.13.11 (107) ||  || 1.13.12 (99) || Marrara Oval || 13,196 || Friday, 20 February, 7:10 PM
|- bgcolor="#FFFFFF"
|  || 0.12.9 (81) ||  || 2.13.9 (105) || Telstra Dome || 22,537 || Friday, 20 February, 7:40 PM
|- bgcolor="#FFFFFF"
|  || 2.10.13 (91) ||  || 4.11.11 (113) || Manuka Oval || 3,227 || Saturday, 21 February, 1:10 PM
|- bgcolor="#FFFFFF"
|  || 1.18.14 (131) ||  || 0.2.14 (26) || Subiaco Oval || 24,101 || Saturday, 21 February, 5:40 PM
|- bgcolor="#FFFFFF"
|  || 1.8.5 (65) ||  || 2.10.7 (85) || Bundaberg Rum Stadium || 7,645 || Saturday, 21 February, 7:10 PM
|- bgcolor="#FFFFFF"
|  || 0.4.16 (40) ||  || 0.12.5 (77) || York Park || 12,443 || Sunday, 22 February, 1:10 PM
|- bgcolor="#FFFFFF"
|  || 2.4.6 (48) ||  || 1.22.9 (150) || Telstra Stadium || 6,190 || Sunday, 22 February, 3:45 PM
|- bgcolor="#FFFFFF"
|  || 1.11.5 (80) ||  || 1.12.12 (93) || AAMI Stadium || 13,905 || Sunday, 22 February, 4:40 PM

Quarter-finals

|- bgcolor="#CCCCFF"
|Home team||Home team score||Away team||Away team score||Ground||Crowd||Date
|- bgcolor="#FFFFFF"
|  || 0.11.9 (75) ||  || 1.11.12 (87) || Telstra Dome || 8,753 || Friday, 27 February, 7:40 PM
|- bgcolor="#FFFFFF"
|  || 1.9.3 (66) ||  || 0.13.8 (86) || Optus Oval || 11,862 || Saturday, 28 February, 2:10 PM
|- bgcolor="#FFFFFF"
|  || 1.12.9 (90) ||  || 2.8.13 (79) || Telstra Dome || 19,120 || Saturday, 28 February, 7:40 PM
|- bgcolor="#FFFFFF"
|  || 2.15.11. (119) ||  || 1.7.6 (57) || Telstra Dome || 18,177 || Sunday, 29 February, 5:10 PM

Semi-finals

|- bgcolor="#CCCCFF"
|Home team||Home team score||Away team||Away team score||Ground||Crowd||Date
|- bgcolor="#FFFFFF"
|  || 2.8.10 (76) ||  || 2.8.11 (77) || Telstra Dome || 18,537 || Friday, 5 March, 7:40 PM
|- bgcolor="#FFFFFF"
|  || 1.11.9 (84) ||  || 2.16.12 (126) || Telstra Dome || 29,536 || Saturday, 6 March, 7:40 PM

Grand Final

|- bgcolor="#CCCCFF"
|Home team||Home team score||Away team||Away team score||Ground||Crowd||Date
|- bgcolor="#FFFFFF"
|  || 1.10.7 (76) ||  || 1.14.5 (98) || Telstra Dome || 50,533 || Saturday, 13 March, 7:30 PM

Scorecard

Grand Final teams

St Kilda Football Club

Geelong Football Club

See also

List of Australian Football League night premiers
2004 AFL season

References

Australian Football League pre-season competition
NAB Cup